Richard Foster was an Australian rules footballer for the Port Adelaide Football Club. In 2014 he began coaching the Freeling Football Club, departing the club midway through 2015.

References

Living people
Year of birth missing (living people)
Port Adelaide Football Club (SANFL) players
Port Adelaide Football Club players (all competitions)
Australian rules footballers from South Australia